The  Changan Alsvin  or Changan Yuexiang is a subcompact sedan produced by Chinese auto maker Changan Automobile. A slightly redesigned facelift called the Alsvin V5 was launched in 2014 as a more premium trim of the Changan Alsvin and positioned slightly above. The Alsvin and Alsvin V5 were different in styling on the front and rear ends and were sold side by side.


First generation

The Alsvin was first previewed at the 2008 Beijing Auto Show in April 2008 as the Changan V101 Concept. The three-box sedan production model started to roll off the assembly line in Chongqing on February 7, 2009, and hit showrooms on March 18 2009. The original Alsvin was designed by Dambrosio Luciano at Changan’s design center in Turin, Italy. A hatchback variant was released in late 2009 and production ended in three years due to low demand.

Originally launched in 2009, the price of the Changan Alsvin ranges from 53,900 yuan to 69,900 yuan which is one of the cheapest sedans on the Chinese auto market. The only engine option is a 114 hp 1.5L with a 5-speed manual transmission.

Alsvin V5 

The Alsvin V5 is a subcompact sedan based on the Alsvin and produced by Changan Auto at the Changan plant in Fangshan, Beijing. The Alsvin V5 is a redesigned, and more premium version of the original Alsvin sedan. During development phase, the V5 was coded B207. The Alsvin V5  launched at the 2012 Beijing Auto Show and was listed in September 2012. In 2013, the combined sales of the original Alsvin sedan and the updated Alsvin V5 reached 52,203.

Both front and rear DRGs have been redesigned and just like the original Changan Alsvin with styling resembling the first generation Mazda 3, the styling of the Alsvin V5 was criticized of resembling the second generation Mazda 3.

The Alsvin V5 is equipped with a Blue Core 1.5 liter inline-4 16V DOHC DVVT engine producing 84 kW and 145Nm with a 5-speed manual transmission or a 4-speed automatic transmission.

Second generation

The second generation Changan Alsvin debuted at the 2018 Beijing Auto Show in April 2018 and is completely redesigned. Prices ranges from 49,900 to 65,900 yuan positioning it under the Changan Eado DT subcompact sedan.

The safety performance features in the second generation Alsvin includes Antilock Breaking Systems (ABS) with Electronic Break-force Distribution (EBD) technology, adaptive cruise control, hill-start assist, blind-spot warning system, rear view camera, tyre pressure monitoring system. The infotainment system in the second generation Alsvin also features the updated InCall intelligent interconnect system.

The second generation Changan Alsvin is available with either a 1.4 liter engine with 101hp or 1.5 liter engine with 107hp mated to a 5-speed manual transmission or 5-speed DCT gearbox.

The second generation Alsvin sedan was launched in Pakistan on 11 January 2021, and is available in three trim levels; Comfort, offered with either manual transmission or dual clutch transmission options, and powered by a 1.3 or 1.5 litre engine, and Lumiere, equipped with sunroof and cruise control and powered by a 1.5 litre engine.

On 21 July 2021, the Alsvin sedan was announced as one of Changan's first models in the Mexican market after its arrival in alliance with MOTORNATION, the same company who markets BAIC and JMC vehicles in the Mexican market, alongside the CS35 Plus, CS55 Plus, CS75 Plus, and UNI-T SUVs. It is powered by either a 1.3 or 1.5 litre engine, and is offered in automatic and manual transmission options.

References

External links 

 

Cars introduced in 2012
2010s cars
Cars of China
Front-wheel-drive vehicles
Alsvin V3
Subcompact cars
Sedans